HMS Ameer (D01) was an American escort carrier, the USS Baffins (CVE-35), that was transferred to the Royal Navy  in mid-1943. As a  served in the Far East until the end of the war. Ameer was returned to the US Navy in 1946 and sold off to commercial service.

Design and description
These ships were all larger and had a greater aircraft capacity than all the preceding American built escort carriers. They were also all laid down as escort carriers and not converted merchant ships.

Armament comprised: two 4"/50, 5"/38 or 5"/51 dual purpose guns in single mounts, sixteen 40 mm Bofors anti-aircraft guns in twin mounts and twenty 20 mm Oerlikon anti-aircraft cannons in single mounts. They had a maximum aircraft capacity of twenty-four aircraft which could be a mixture of Grumman Martlet, Vought Corsair or Hawker Sea Hurricane fighter aircraft and Fairey Swordfish or Grumman Avenger anti-submarine aircraft.

Pre-service
Baffins was launched 18 October 1942 by Seattle-Tacoma Shipbuilding, Tacoma, Washington; sponsored by Mrs. Laurence Bennett, wife of Commander Bennett; and commissioned 28 June 1943.

Baffins remained at Puget Sound Navy Yard until 18 July 1943.  Her classification was changed to CVE-35 on 15 July 1943.  On 18 July, she proceeded to Vancouver, British Columbia, Canada, where she was decommissioned the following day and transferred to the United Kingdom under Lend-Lease.

Now HMS Ameer, she was refitted to Royal Navy requirements, including a lengthened flight deck, the installation of ASDIC (Sonar), the adaptation of fire-fighting and ventilation systems, and the alteration of bomb and torpedo storage to accommodate either American or British ordnance.

Active service

 
Once she arrived in Britain, she was allocated to the British Eastern Fleet, sailing as escort in May 1944 to convoy KMF-31 to the Mediterranean, while en route to Trincomalee, Ceylon.

In early 1945, Ameer joined Force 61 as cover for Operation Lightning, the amphibious assault by 3 Commando Brigade (two Royal Marine units and one Army unit) on Akyab, Burma.  In the event, Japanese forces had evacuated the area 48 hours earlier, making a heavy bombardment unnecessary.

The bombardment was to reduce Japanese artillery batteries in advance of landings by the 71st and 4th Brigades. A few days later, Ameer covered landings on nearby Cheduba Island by the Royal Marines (Operation Sankey) that were, once again, unopposed; indeed, the whole island was unoccupied.

The objective was Operation Stacey, the first of three photo-reconnaissance missions designed to cover the Hastings Harbor and Phuket Island areas of the Kra Isthmus. The reconnaissance was successful without Japanese interference on 26 to 28 February. The following day the task force was located and attacked. Grumman Hellcats fighters from Ameer and Empress repulsed the Japanese aircraft.

On 20 June, at the end of the scheduled operation, the task force pilots executed offensive sweeps. Ameer's Hellcats joined those from 808 Naval Air Squadron and Supermarine Seafires from 809 Naval Air Squadron to attack Japanese air bases at Lhoksemawe, Medan and Bindjai, strafing installations and aircraft. Anti-aircraft fire shot down one Hellcat.Ameer's last two operations were supporting mine-sweeping off potential landing sites. The second, Operation Livery, starting on 24 July, cleared the approaches to Phuket Island, off the Kra Isthmus;  was part of the covering force. On 26 July, Task Force 63 came under bomber and kamikaze attack and the minesweeper  was hit. Japan surrendered three weeks later.

Squadrons
As a fighter carrier, HMS Ameer could carry up to 24 aircraft.  In her active service, she carried mostly American Grumman Hellcat II (at first called Gannet) fighters, although Grumman Wildcat V (initially called Martlets) were also carried, as were Supermarine Walrus I amphibians at the end of the war.

Post-war
HMS Ameer was returned to the United States Navy at Norfolk, Virginia on 17 January 1946 and subsequently sold into merchant service 17 September 1946 as Robin Kirk''.

She was later scrapped in Taiwan in 1969.

Notes

References

 DANFS: Baffins

 

Ruler-class escort carriers
Ships built in Tacoma, Washington
1942 ships